Walfriede Schmitt (March 26, 1943 in Berlin;) is a German actress. She is the daughter of the actress Elfriede Florin.

Schmitt is best known in Germany for starring in the television series Für alle Fälle Stefanie.

She played 'Philipp's mother' in the 1989 film Coming Out.  Late in 1989, she became the final president of the Union of Art, before it merged into its West German equivalent.

References

External links

1943 births
Actresses from Berlin
German film actresses
Living people